GAS2-like protein 1 is a protein that in humans is encoded by the GAS2L1 gene.

The protein encoded by this gene, a member of the GAS2 family, is similar in sequence to the mouse protein Gas2, an actin-associated protein expressed at high levels in growth-arrested cells. Expression of the mouse Gas2 gene is negatively regulated by serum and growth factors. Three transcript variants encoding two different isoforms have been found for this gene.

References

Further reading